Carly Binding (born 2 February 1978) is a New Zealand pop singer-songwriter, and former member of the girl group TrueBliss. In 2000 she left the group, citing personal differences, and decided to pursue a solo career. Her debut solo album Passenger peaked at #6 on the New Zealand album charts and went gold. It was also released in Australia, where Binding has since toured extensively.

She was born and raised in the city of Tauranga.

Her second (and final) album So Radiate was released on 3 July 2006. Supporting this album, she undertook a tour of New Zealand with fellow singer-songwriter Donald Reid.

In 2007, Binding was invited to play at the music festival SXSW which is held in Austin, Texas each year.  This led to her spending a further four months in the US playing regular shows at venues on the Sunset Strip and surrounding areas in Los Angeles.

Carly's father, Wellesley Binding, is a New Zealand painter.

From 2009 to 2015, Binding was in a relationship with former Kiwi league player Matthew Ridge. In November 2010, the couple had a son, London Luca Ridge. The couple separated in 2014 and Binding confirmed the split in February 2015.

In 2012 Binding appeared on the Auckland musical theatre scene.

Discography

With TrueBliss 

 Dream (1999) Columbia

Albums

Singles

References

External links 
Carly Binding NZ music forum

TrueBliss at AudioCulture

1978 births
Living people
People from Tauranga
New Zealand women pop singers
Participants in New Zealand reality television series
21st-century New Zealand women singers